Joseph Philip Ryan (born June 5, 1996) is an American professional baseball pitcher for the Minnesota Twins of Major League Baseball (MLB). He was drafted by the Tampa Bay Rays in the 7th round of the 2018 Major League Baseball draft.

Amateur career
Ryan attended Sir Francis Drake High School (now Archie Williams High School) in San Anselmo, California. He was drafted by the San Francisco Giants in the 39th round of the 2014 Major League Baseball draft, but did not sign and played college baseball at California State University, Northridge. In 2015 and 2016, he played collegiate summer baseball with the Orleans Firebirds of the Cape Cod Baseball League, and was named a league all-star in 2016. In 2018, he transferred to California State University, Stanislaus.

Professional career

Tampa Bay Rays
Ryan was drafted by the Tampa Bay Rays in the seventh round, 210th overall, of the 2018 MLB draft and signed. Ryan made his professional debut with the Hudson Valley Renegades, compiling a 2-1 record with a 3.72 ERA over  innings.

Ryan started 2019 with the Bowling Green Hot Rods and was promoted to the Charlotte Stone Crabs and Montgomery Biscuits during the season. Over 24 games (22 starts) between the three clubs, Ryan pitched to a 9-4 record with a 1.96 ERA, striking out 183 batters over  innings.

Ryan did not play in a game in 2020 due to the cancellation of the minor league season because of the COVID-19 pandemic. Ryan was assigned to the Triple-A Durham Bulls to begin the 2021 season, and logged a 4-3 record and 3.63 ERA in 12 appearances, 11 of them starts.

Minnesota Twins
On July 22, 2021, while Ryan was in Tokyo competing in the 2020 Summer Olympics, he was traded alongside Drew Strotman to the Minnesota Twins in exchange for Nelson Cruz and Calvin Faucher. After making 2 starts for the Triple-A St. Paul Saints, posting an ERA of 2.00 with 17 strikeouts, the Twins selected Ryan's contract when the rosters expanded.
Ryan made his MLB debut on September 1, 2021, starting against the Chicago Cubs. He pitched 5 innings, gave up 3 runs, and struck out 5.

On April 1, 2022, manager Rocco Baldelli announced that Ryan would be the 2022 Opening Day starting pitcher and start his first career Opening Day against the Seattle Mariners.

International career
In May 2021, Ryan was named to the roster of the United States national baseball team for qualifying for baseball at the 2020 Summer Olympics. After the team qualified, he was named to the Olympics roster on July 2. The team went on to win silver, falling to Japan in the gold-medal game.

References

External links

Living people
1996 births
People from San Anselmo, California
Baseball players from California
United States national baseball team players
Olympic baseball players of the United States
Baseball players at the 2020 Summer Olympics
Medalists at the 2020 Summer Olympics
Olympic silver medalists for the United States in baseball
Major League Baseball pitchers
Minnesota Twins players
Stanislaus State Warriors baseball players
Cal State Northridge Matadors baseball players
Orleans Firebirds players
Hudson Valley Renegades players
Bowling Green Hot Rods players
Charlotte Stone Crabs players
Montgomery Biscuits players
Durham Bulls players
St. Paul Saints players